FC Dieppe, officially Football Club Dieppois, is a team in the French football club based in Dieppe (Seine-Maritime). It was founded in 1896. They play at the Stade des Vertus, which has a capacity of 2,600 (stretchable to 8,000). The colours of the club are white and blue.

Since the 2018–19 season the club plays in the Championnat National 3.

Current squad

Honours 
 Haute-Normandie DH championship: 1952, 1956, 1961, 1973, 1987, 1991, 1996
 Championnat de France Amateur 2: 2013 (Group A)

Statistics

External links 
  Official website

References 

Football clubs in France
Association football clubs established in 1896
Sport in Seine-Maritime
1896 establishments in France
FC
Football clubs in Normandy